A lemon-lime soft drink or lemon-lime soda (also known colloquially as lemonade in the United Kingdom, Australia and New Zealand and as cider in Japan and South Korea) is a carbonated soft drink with lemon and lime flavoring. Popular brands include Sprite, 7 Up, and Starry.

Description
Lemon-lime soft drinks are typically colorless, however cloudy varieties such as Limca are also available. Similar in appearance and flavor to the clear variety of lemonade found in the UK and Australia, lemon-lime soft drinks are often packaged in green bottles to better distinguish them from soda water.

Brands

Global
 Sprite
 7UP

India
 Citra – a clear lemon and lime flavoured soda sold in India in the  1980s and early 1990s.
Banta – packaged in a codd-neck bottle
Limca
 Nimbooz

Japan
 Mitsuya Cider
 Ramune (First Lemon-Lime Soda)

South Korea
 Chilsung Cider

Brazil
 Soda Limonada Antarctica

Sri Lanka
 Elephant House Lemonade

Denmark
 Faxe Kondi

Sweden
 Fruktsoda

Ukraine
Premyera Lymon (Прем'єра Лимон)
Biola Quake (Біола Квейк)

United States
 Bubble Up
 Sierra Mist (discontinued in 2023)
 Green River
 Kick – produced by Royal Crown Company, Inc. and developed in 1965, it was discontinued in North America in 2002 when Royal Crown was acquired by Cadbury Schweppes plc through its acquisition of Snapple.
 Summit Citrus Twist – a clear lemon and lime flavored soda sold in the United States by Aldi
 Up-Rite – Made by the ShopRite retail chain
 Prime
 Dr. Enuf
 Slice
 Starry
 Storm
 Sun Crest – introduced in 1938
 Upper 10

Tunisia
 Boga

Turkey

 Uludağ Gazoz
 Fruko
 Çamlıca Gazoz
 Niğde Gazoz

Other
 Lemonsoda – Italian
 Lift
 Quwat Jabal – sold in the Middle East and produced by The Coca-Cola Company
 Solo
 Teem
 Chinotto – Venezuela
 Veep (replaced by Sprite)

See also

 Lemon-lime soda cocktail
 List of brand name soft drinks products
 List of soft drink flavors
 List of soft drink producers
 List of soft drinks by country
 Lemonade
 Limeade
 Bitter lemon
 Lemon, lime and bitters
 List of citrus soft drinks

References

 
Japanese inventions
Soft drinks
Lists of brand name drinks